Patrick Deane may refer to:
 Patrick Deane (footballer)
 Patrick Deane (professor)

See also
 Patrick Dean (disambiguation)